Emmanuel Arago (6 August 1812, Paris – 26 November 1896) was a French politician of the French Second Republic, Second French Empire and French Third Republic. He was the son of François Arago. He was a member of the 1848 Constituent Assembly and the National Assembly of 1871. He was a deputy for Pyrénées-Orientales (1848–1851, 1871–1876) and la Seine (1869–1870) and senator for Pyrénées-Orientales (1876–1896). He served as minister of the interior and minister of justice in the Government of France. He was ambassador of France to Switzerland.

References

External links

 Notice biographique sur le site 19e.org
 Sa fiche sur le site de l'Assemblée nationale
 Sa fiche sur le site du Sénat

1812 births
1896 deaths
Politicians from Paris
The Mountain (1849) politicians
Opportunist Republicans
French Ministers of Justice
French interior ministers
Members of the 1848 Constituent Assembly
Members of the National Legislative Assembly of the French Second Republic
Members of the 4th Corps législatif of the Second French Empire
Members of the National Assembly (1871)
French Senators of the Third Republic
Senators of Pyrénées-Orientales
Ambassadors of France to Switzerland
Prefects of France
19th-century French civil servants